Scipione Bongalli (1501–1564) was a Roman Catholic prelate who served as Bishop of Civita Castellana e Orte (1539–1564).

Biography
Scipione Bongalli was born in 1501.
On 24 Nov 1539, he was appointed during the papacy of Pope Paul III as Bishop of Civita Castellana e Orte.
He served as Bishop of Civita Castellana e Orte until his death on 3 Aug 1564.

References

External links and additional sources
 (for Chronology of Bishops) 
 (for Chronology of Bishops) 

16th-century Italian Roman Catholic bishops
Bishops appointed by Pope Paul III
1521 births
1564 deaths